Events from the year 1631 in Denmark.

Incumbents 

 Monarch – Christian IV

Events 
 2 June  Frederik III gave 20 Danish-Dutch peasants the rights to settle at Allégade, founding the settlement of "Ny Amager" (New Amager) or "Ny Hollænderby" (New Dutchman-town) in what would later become known as Frederiksberg.

Undated
Construction of Nyboder begins.

Births 

22 February – Peder Syv, philologist, folklorist and priest, known for his collections of Danish proverbs and folksongs (died 1702).
15 July – Jens Juel, diplomat and statesman (died 1700)

Deaths 
14 October – Sophie of Mecklenburg-Güstrow, Queen of Denmark and Norway, and mother of King Christian IV (born 1557 in Wismar)

References 

 
Denmark
Years of the 17th century in Denmark